Le Pays de la Sagouine is an Acadian celebration in Bouctouche, New Brunswick, Canada, founded by Antonine Maillet.

History
Maillet wanted to show what it was like to live the Acadian life and by writing over forty novels on the Acadians (including her award-winning novel "La Sagouine"), she did just that. Le Pays de la Sagouine is a reenactment of the Acadian culture and is both entertaining and historic for viewers. Le Pays de la Sagouine is said to attract 68,000 people a season, which far exceeds the population of Bouctouche (2,426). The island (Flea Island / Île-aux-Puces) where Le Pays de la Sagouine is standing was owned by Antoine LeBlanc of Bouctouche. The site's restaurant l'Ordre du bon temps was destroyed by fire on October 23, 2008 but has been rebuilt and is currently in operation.

External links
The Official Website Of Le Pays de la Sagouine
Information on Le Pays de la Sagouine

Cultural festivals in Canada
Acadian culture in New Brunswick
Festivals in New Brunswick
Tourism in New Brunswick
Tourist attractions in Kent County, New Brunswick
Bouctouche